Elburgo is a village and municipality located in the province of Álava, in the Basque Country, northern Spain.

The municipality officially has a dual name, "Elburgo/Burgelu", reflecting the officially bilingual status of this province of Spain. However, in practice the municipality and village are commonly referred to by one or the other name, depending on the language.

The municipality encompasses an area of some 32 km². In 2004, its recorded population was 453 inhabitants.

Elburgo comprises six villages and their respective communes (concejos):
 Añua
 Arbulu
 Argomaniz
 Elburgo (the municipality's capital and largest settlement)
 Gazeta
 Hijona - Ixona

References

External links
 ELBURGO in the Bernardo Estornés Lasa - Auñamendi Encyclopedia 

Municipalities in Álava